Sparks, originally titled Halfnelson, is the debut album by the Los Angeles rock band Sparks. The album was first released as Halfnelson, the band's original name, and reissued a year later under the group’s new name.

Recording
At this point in their career, Halfnelson was a three piece group comprising the Mael brothers and guitarist Earle Mankey. The  demos that the trio had recorded in Mankey's home studio came to the attention of musician and producer Todd Rundgren, who signed them to the Bearsville label and produced their debut album in 1971. Interviewed in 2013, the duo recalled their collaboration with Rundgren as a very positive experience. 

Ron Mael: "It was intimidating for us just to be in a studio, but he was really incredibly open to what we were doing, and I think we really felt like kindred spirits, even though some of his own music was kinda maybe more soul-based. But he was an Anglophile just the way we were Anglophiles. It all went incredibly well with him personally and musically."

Russell Mael: "To his credit, he didn't wanna change what we were doing, he just wanted the fidelity to be a little better. So we were going into an expensive recording studio with Todd, but still banging on cardboard boxes and all. He could see that the recording process was kind of a part of what we were. It wasn't that we needed to be changed into a traditional band. The way we were recording was a fair part of what we were and what made us interesting as a band to him.”

"Wonder Girl", the band's first single, exemplified both the Maels' unorthodox approach, and Rundgren's openness to it: 

Russell Mael: "Todd really wanted to preserve the quality of the demo. It's not like a live band sound at all. The guitar parts are really deliberate. The recording has a real character to it.”

Ron Mael: "The keyboard on that was the Wurlitzer. It was always difficult for me to figure out how a keyboard really worked with a band. So in that particular song, it was kind of a two-note riff.”

Release
Halfnelson was initially released on Bearsville Records in 1971. Shortly after the release of the album the group changed their name to 'Sparks'. The album was then re-released by Bearsville Records in 1972 as Sparks. The new version of the album featured new artwork that was simpler, displaying the group in more of a classic pose superimposed against a red brick pattern. The single to this reissue "Wonder Girl", became a minor regional hit in certain parts of Alabama and California and also appeared on the lower end of the Cashbox chart at #92. The single also Bubbled Under the Hot 100 at No. 112. The tracks "Roger" and "Saccharin and the War" are re-recorded versions of songs from their untitled 1969 demo album, which is erroneously referred to as "The 'A Woofer In Tweeter's Clothing' Demos".

Re-issue
Sparks has been re-released numerous times since 1972. It is often packaged with the follow-up album A Woofer in Tweeter's Clothing. One such re-issue was released in 1975 to capitalize on the group's success in the UK. This version was titled 2 Originals of Sparks and was packaged as a double-LP in a gatefold sleeve with a 14-page booklet.

The most recent cd re-issue was released in 2019 in The Netherlands on Music On Cd.

Track listing

Personnel
Halfnelson
 Russell Mael - vocals
 Ron Mael - keyboards, piano, organ
 Earle Mankey - guitar, lead vocal on "Biology 2"
 Jim Mankey - bass guitar
 Harley Feinstein - drums
Technical
Todd Rundgren - producer
Thaddeus James Lowe - engineer
Ron Mael - artwork
Larry Dupont - photography

References

External links
Sparks - The "Halfnelson/Sparks" album files
FanMael

Sparks (band) albums
1971 debut albums
Albums produced by Todd Rundgren
Bearsville Records albums
Rhino Entertainment albums
Repertoire Records albums
Wounded Bird Records albums
Victor Entertainment albums
Art pop albums
Pop rock albums by American artists